Floyd Rowe Watson (April 23, 1872, Lawrence, Kansas – January 18, 1974) was an American experimental physicist, known for his research on acoustics and the acoustical design of buildings.

Biography

After graduating from Los Angeles High School, Floyd R. Watson worked for several Los Angeles County newspapers, including the Los Angeles Times. He received in 1899 his B.S. from Los Angeles Normal School, now known as the University of California, Los Angeles (UCLA). He received in 1902 his Ph.D. in physics from Cornell University with thesis Surface tension at the interface of two liquids determined experimentally by the method of ripple waves. His Ph.D. thesis advisor was Edward Leamington Nichols. At the University of Illinois Urbana-Champaign, Watson was from 1902 to 1904 an instructor, from 1904 to 1915 an assistant professor, from 1915 to 1917 an associate professor, and from 1917 to 1940 a professor of experimental physics, retiring in 1940 as professor emeritus. He worked as an acoustical consultant until he was over ninety years old.

In approximately the first week of September 1928, Watson and Wallace Waterfall (1900–1974), a former doctoral student of Watson, were invited by UCLA's Vern Oliver Knudsen to an evening dinner at Knudsen's beach club near Los Angeles. The three physicists decided to form a society of acoustical engineers interested in architectural acoustics. Wallace Waterfall sent letters to thirteen men. On December 10, 1928, letters were sent to all thirteen of the previously chosen men and to three additional men. Harvey Fletcher offered the use of the Bell Telephone Laboratories at 463 West Street in Manhattan as a meeting place for an organizational, initial meeting to be held on December 27, 1928. The meeting was attended by about forty scientists and engineers who started the Acoustical Society of America (ASA). The first issue of the Journal of the Acoustical Society of America was published in October 1929. Watson was the editor-in-chief of the Journal of the Acoustical Society of America from 1929 to 1939 and the ASA's president from 1939 to 1941.

Watson was elected in 1909 a Fellow of the American Association for the Advancement of Science.

In 1902 he married Estelle Jane Barden. They had two sons. Their younger son, Robert Barden Watson, was one of the U.S. Army's leading experts on electronics. Their elder son, Norman Allen Watson, was a UCLA physics professor, who did research on acoustics.

Selected publications

Articles

Books & pamphlets

References

External links
 
 
 
 
 

Acousticians
American centenarians
Men centenarians
19th-century American physicists
20th-century American physicists
1872 births
1974 deaths
University of California, Los Angeles alumni
Cornell University alumni
University of Illinois Urbana-Champaign faculty
People from Lawrence, Kansas
People from Los Angeles
Fellows of the Acoustical Society of America
Fellows of the American Association for the Advancement of Science
Acoustical Society of America